"Good Luck Charm" is a song recorded by Elvis Presley and published by Gladys Music, Elvis Presley's publishing company, that reached number 1 on the Billboard Hot 100 list in the week ending April 21, 1962. It remained at the top of the list for two weeks. It was also no. 1 on the Cash Box chart in the U.S. It reached number 1 in the UK Singles Chart in the week ending 24 May 1962 and stayed there for five weeks.

Background

The song was written by Aaron Schroeder and Wally Gold and recorded at RCA Studio B in Nashville, Tennessee by Presley on October 15, 1961. It completed his second hat-trick of chart topping singles in the UK.  Presley is joined vocally on the chorus by Jordanaires first tenor Gordon Stoker.

The single was certified Platinum by the RIAA on March 27, 1992.

The single reached No. 2 on the UK singles chart in a five-week chart run in 2005 in a re-release.

The B side was "Anything That's Part of You" which also reached the Top 40 in the U.S.

The recording was featured in the TV series The Path in the 2018 episode entitled Bad Faith.

Personnel
Recorded on October 15, 1961, at RCA's Studio B, Nashville, the session featured the following personnel"

Jerry Kennedy, guitar, replacing the injured Hank Garland
Scotty Moore, guitar  
Bob Moore, bass. 
Buddy Harman, drums
D.J. Fontana, drums  
Floyd Cramer, piano and organ
Boots Randolph, saxophone
Gordon Stoker, accordion
Millie Kirkham, backing vocals
The Jordanaires, backing vocals

Other recordings
The Marvelettes released a version on the 1962 album The Marvelettes Sing and on Smash Hits Of '62 as Tamla TM 229. It was also recorded by Jo (of the duo Judy & Jo) as an answer song in 1962, entitled "Don't Want to Be Another Good Luck Charm", released as a 45 single on Capitol Records as catalog number CP-1468.

Art Garfunkel recorded "Good Luck Charm" for the 1997 album Songs from a Parent to a Child.

Alvin and the Chipmunks covered the song for "Luck O' The Chipmunks", a 1988 episode of Alvin and the Chipmunks.

The song was covered by Travis & Shook on the 2006 collection Cape Cod Covers, Vol. 1: "The King".

Johnny O'Keefe, Bobby Stevens, Rupert, The Beatniks, Lawrence Welk, and Helmut Lotti have also recorded the song.

Album appearances
The first LP appearance was on the album Elvis' Golden Records Volume 3 released in September, 1963. It was on the 1973 RCA Special Products Elvis double LP compilation (DPL2-0056(e)) and the 1978 package Worldwide Gold Award Hits, Parts 3 and 4 (R214657), a 2 record set. The recording was included on the 1993 compilation From Nashville to Memphis: The Essential '60s Masters. The track also appeared on the 1999 career retrospective collection Artist of the Century. The song was also featured on the 2002 compilation ELV1S: 30 No. 1 Hits.

References

1962 singles
Billboard Hot 100 number-one singles
Cashbox number-one singles
UK Singles Chart number-one singles
Number-one singles in Norway
Elvis Presley songs
Songs written by Aaron Schroeder
Songs written by Wally Gold
Song recordings produced by Stephen H. Sholes
1961 songs
RCA Victor singles